Alfred Francis Spenceley (1889–1960) was the Amateur Boxing Association of England lightweight champion in 1911. He fought as Alf Spenceley. He boxed with the Old Goldsmiths Amateur Boxing Club.

Biography
Spenceley won the 1911 Amateur Boxing Association British lightweight title, when boxing out of the Old Goldsmiths ABC.

In 1911 he and Reuben Charles Warnes and Frank Parks went to the United States, with the A.B.A. to fight in Madison Square Garden in a series of exhibition bouts.

References

Lightweight boxers
1889 births
1960 deaths
England Boxing champions
English male boxers